Keonjhar State, also known as Keunjhar, was one of the princely states of India during the period of the British Raj. The second largest of the states of the Orissa States Agency, it was located in present-day Kendujhar district, Odisha. 

The state was bounded in the north by Singhbhum District, in the east by the State of Mayurbhanj and Balasore District, in the south by Dhenkanal State and Cuttack District, and in the west by the states of Pal Lahara and Bonai. 
The state consisted of two clearly differentiated areas: Low Keonjhar, a region of flat river valleys — the main river being the Baitarani, and the High Keonjhar, an area of forests dominated by mountain ranges with the Gandhamadan reaching a height of 1078 m.
The capital was at Keonjhar.

History
According to traditions, Keonjhar State was founded sometime during the 12th century during the rule of the Eastern Ganga dynasty when the founder Jyoti Bhanj of the Bhanj dynasty, who was the brother of Adi Bhanj of Mayurbhanj, was enthroned as the Raja of Keonjhar with the help of dominant local Bhuyan clans. The influence of Bhuyans on the enthronement rituals and regnal traditions of Keonjhar suggests a long-standing relationship with the kingdom.

Around 14th cen a prince from Keonjhar named Ananga Bhanja, who was nephew of the Raja of Keonjhar was named the King of Baudh by the local chieftains under Ganga rule.

After the independence of India in 1947 Keonjhar merged into Republic of India on 1 January 1948 following which it became the part of Keonjhar  district (now Kendujhar).

Rulers
The rulers of Keonjhar State of the Bhanj dynasty. The Keonjhar royal family adopted the emblems of the neighbouring State of Mayurbhanj, a peacock and the yellow and blue colours. 

Jyoti Bhanj (12th cen CE)
...
Jagannath Bhanj (1688 - 1700)
Raghunath Bhanj (1700 - 1719)
Gopinath Bhanj (1719 - 1736)
Narsingh Narayan Bhanj (1736 - 1757)
Daneswar Narayan Bhanj (1757 - 1758)
Jagateswar Narayan Bhanj (1758 - 1762)
Pratap Balbhadra Bhanj (1762 - 1794)
Janardan Bhanj (1794 - 1825)
Gadadhar Narayan Bhanj Deo (1825 - 22 March 1861) 
Dhanurjai Narayan Bhanj Deo (4 September 1861 – 27 October 1905)
Gopinath Narayan Bhanj Deo (27 Oct 1905 – 12 August 1926)
Balbhadra Narayan Bhanj Deo (12 Aug 1926 – 1 January 1948)

Titular
Balbhadra Narayan Bhanj Deo (1 January 1948 – 1963)
Nrusingh Narayan Bhanj Deo (1963 – 2016)
Anant  Narayan Bhanj Deo (2016 – 1 December 2019)
Dhananjay Bhanj Deo (1 December 2019 – current)

See also 
 Eastern States Agency
 Political integration of India

References

Princely states of Odisha
History of Odisha
Kendujhar district
12th-century establishments in India
1948 disestablishments in India